Carlo Barberini, Duke of Monterotondo, (28 May 1562 – 26 February 1630) was an Italian nobleman of the Barberini family and lieutenant general of the papal army. He was the brother of Maffeo Barberini,  who was elected to the papal throne as Pope Urban VIII.

Carlo Barberini was the son of Antonio Barberini and Camilla Barbadori. As their eldest son he became patriarch of the Barberini family.

In 1594, he married Costanza Magalotti (1575–1644), daughter of  Vincenzo Magalotti and  Clarice Capponi and sister of Lorenzo Magalotti.

They had six children including Taddeo Barberini, Francesco Barberini and Antonio Barberini (Antonio the Younger). When Barberini's brother was elected to the papal throne as Pope Urban VIII, Francesco and Antonio were both elevated to Cardinal. Taddeo was given the title of Prince of Palestrina, later passed on to successive Barberini patriarchs.

Barberini did not escape his brother's famous nepotism; he was appointed Gonfalonier of the Church and Duke of Monterotondo, a commune Barberini later bought.

In 1626, he published a treatise concerning the disciplinary and administrative reorganization of the Papal army. He also left an unpublished synopsis on The Prince by Niccolò Machiavelli.

See also

Gonfalone of the Church
Monterotondo
Barberini

References

1562 births
1630 deaths
Carlo Don